Jim Henson's Mother Goose Stories is a children's television show hosted by Mother Goose, who tells her three goslings the stories behind well-known nursery rhymes.

Production
The show featured child actors and elaborate puppets created by Jim Henson's Creature Shop. The show featured puppeteers Mike Quinn, Mak Wilson, and Karen Prell as various characters, along with Angie Passmore as the titular Mother Goose.

Fourteen of the episodes were based on stories in L. Frank Baum's 1897 book Mother Goose in Prose, while the others were original tales written for the show. The general look of the characters was based on the work of Maxfield Parrish, the artist who illustrated Baum's book.

The series was originally conceived as a co-production between the Jim Henson Company and Television South West for British television and was first broadcast on Children's ITV in the UK in 1988. A pilot episode, the story of "Humpty Dumpty", was produced in 1987 along with other episodes. The series was considered for a network slot in 1987, but was passed on. The first release of the series came in 1988 through a home video release as part of Jim Henson's Play-Along Video series. The video featured three episodes of the show, "Little Miss Muffet", "A Song of Sixpence" and "Boy Blue", plus original linking footage between each story.

The series finally found a home as a broadcast series on The Disney Channel starting on August 25, 1990, and was the company's first new television series to debut after the death of Jim Henson. Mother Goose Stories had three production seasons, spawning thirty-nine eight-minute episodes. For airing on The Disney Channel, the 39 independently produced episodes were grouped into 13 broadcast episodes to fit the half-hour time slot. Each of these broadcast episodes was composed of three separate stories (with individual opening titles and closing credits attached to each one). The show continued to air on The Disney Channel until 1993.

The first and third seasons of Mother Goose Stories were directed by Brian Henson, in one of his earliest directorial efforts for The Jim Henson Company, while Michael Kerrigan directed the episodes in the second season. Henson and Kerrigan received a Daytime Emmy Award for Outstanding Directing in a Children's Program for their work on the show.

A video of the series was also released by CEL Home Video in Australia along with several other films and TV shows from The Jim Henson Company.

Plot
Mother Goose tells her three goslings the stories behind well-known nursery rhymes and fairy tales; examples include "Old King Cole," "Eeiny Meeiny Miny Moe," and "The Magic Nut Tree."

Episodes

Season 1 (1990)
 Little Miss Muffet
 A Song of Sixpence
 Boy Blue
 Little Bo Peep
 Old King Cole
 Hey, Diddle Diddle
 Humpty Dumpty
 Hickory Dickory Dock
 Little Jack Horner
 The Prince and the Beggars
 Baa Baa Black Sheep
 Mary, Mary
 Tommy Tucker

Season 2 (1991)
 Eenie Meenie
 Dicky Birds
 The Crooked Man
 Mother Hubbard
 Eensy Weensy Spider
 Hector Protector
 Mary's Little Lamb
 Duke of York
 Pat-a-Cake
 Jack Be Nimble
 Willie Winkie
 Man in the Moon
 Jack & Jill

Season 3 (1992)
 The Queen of Hearts
 Hickety Pickety
 Pussy Cat, Pussy Cat
 Peter, Peter Pumpkin Eater
 Ride a Cock Horse to Banbury Cross
 It's Raining, It's Pouring
 The Giant
 Tommy Tittlemouse
 Little Nut Tree
 Little Girl with a Curl
 Twinkle, Twinkle, Little Star
 Margery Daw
 Rub a Dub Dub

Cast

Puppeteers
 Angie Passmore - Mother Goose
 Karen Prell - Yellow Gosling, Cat (ep. 5), Cow (ep. 11), Little Boy Blue's Mother (ep. 11), Peter the Dicky Bird (ep. 15), Topiary Peacock (ep. 15), Old Mother Hubbard (ep. 17), Peter's Wife (ep. 30)
 Mike Quinn - Brown Gosling, Humpty Dumpty (ep. 1), Sheep (ep. 11), Paul the Dicky Bird (ep. 15), Barkley the Dog (ep. 17)
 Mak Wilson - Gold Gosling, Coutchie-Coulou (ep. 1), King (ep. 1), Speckled Hen (ep. 1), Squire (ep. 11), Royal Gardener (ep. 15), Butcher (ep. 17), Sherlock Hubbard (ep. 17), Man in the Moon (ep. 25)

Guest stars
 Victoria Shalet - Dorothy / Jenny (The Giant / The Little Girl with the Curl)
 J.J. Flynn - (Pat a Cake)
 Sam Preston - (It's Raining, It's Pouring)

Awards
Daytime Emmy Awards

 Outstanding Directing in a Children's Series (Brian Henson, Michael Kerrigan)
 Outstanding Achievement in Costume Design (Mark Storey, Jacqueline Mills, Jill Thraves)

References

External links
 

1990 American television series debuts
1992 American television series endings
1990s American children's television series
1990 British television series debuts
1992 British television series endings
1990s British children's television series
1990s preschool education television series
American preschool education television series
American television shows featuring puppetry
British preschool education television series
British television shows featuring puppetry
Disney Channel original programming
ITV children's television shows
Works based on nursery rhymes
Television series about ducks
Television shows based on poems
Television series by The Jim Henson Company